The 9th Infantry Division (พล.ร.๙.) also known as Black Panthers Division is an infantry division of the Royal Thai Army, it is currently a part of the First Army Area The unit is composed of the 9th Infantry Regiment, 19th Infantry Regiment and 29th Infantry Regiment.

History
After World War II ended in 1945, Vietnam announced that it would fight France for the liberation of Vietnam. The French colonies had to fight for 8 years until France accepted defeat and signed the Geneva Convention 1954 in Geneva. As a result, Vietnam was divided into two parts the North Vietnam and South Vietnam with the 17th parallel as the boundary between the two Vietnams. Under the leadership of Ho Chi Minh, who sought to reunite Vietnam, the North supported the Viet Cong as it harassed and infiltrated South Vietnam. The US government sent troops to assist the South Vietnamese military in alliance with Australia, New Zealand, the Philippines, South Korea and Thailand with Spain sending a medical unit.  At the beginning of the Vietnam war the Thai government approved the principle of sending military assistance to the Government of the Republic of Vietnam. A task force was set up, called the Royal Thai Volunteer Regiment, whose mission was to fight and carry out civic action programs to assist South Vietnam. Combat operations in Vietnam had the nickname "Cobra". Preparations went forward for rotating volunteer regiments, under a Royal Thai Army Expeditionary Division.

On 9 June 1971, the Royal Thai Army issued an order setting up at Lat Ya, Muang district, Kanchanaburi province a new division composed of the volunteers who fought in Vietnam called the 9th Infantry Division, the reason being the twenty-four anniversary of the coronation of His Majesty King Bhumibol on 21 June 1974, the army has established the 9th Infantry Division also known as "Fort Kanchanaburi" or "Fort Surasi" in nowaday.

Vietnam War (1967-1972)  
 see Thailand in the Vietnam War
The Kingdom of Thailand, under the administration of military dictator Field Marshall Thanom Kittikachorn took an active role in the Vietnam War. Thailand was the third-largest provider of ground forces to South Vietnam, following the Americans and South Koreans.

Due to its proximity to Thailand, Vietnam's conflicts were closely monitored by Bangkok. Thai involvement did not become official until the total involvement of the United States in support of South Vietnam in 1963. The Thai government then allowed the United States Air Force in Thailand to use its air and naval bases. At the height of the war, almost 50,000 American military personnel were stationed in Thailand, mainly airmen.

In October 1967 the Royal Thai Volunteer Regiment (Queen's Cobras) was sent to Camp Bearcat at Bien Hoa, to fight alongside the Americans, Australians, New Zealanders and South Vietnamese. In 1968 the Cobras were replaced by the Royal Thai Army Expeditionary Division ("Black Panthers"). About 40,000 Thai military would serve in South Vietnam, with 351 killed in action and 1,358 wounded. The last Thai ground forces were withdrawn from South Vietnam on 5 February 1972.

East Timor (1999–2002) 
After the East Timor crisis, Thailand, with 28 other nations, provided troops for the International Force for East Timor or INTERFET. Thailand also provided the force commander, Lieutenant General Winai Phattiyakul. The force was based in Dili and lasted from 25 October 1999 to 20 May 2002.

Iraq War (2003–2004) 
After the successful US invasion of Iraq, Thailand contributed 423 non-combat troops in August 2003 to nation building and medical assistance in post-Saddam Iraq. Troops of the Royal Thai Army were attacked in the 2003 Karbala bombings, which killed two soldiers and wounded five others. However, the Thai mission in Iraq was considered an overall success, and Thailand withdrew its forces in August 2004. The mission is considered the main reason the United States decided to designate Thailand as a major non-NATO ally in 2003.

Operation Deployments
 In 1968-1970 Combat missions in South Vietnam (Black Panther Division) Part of Vietnam War
 In 1972-1973 anti-communist operations Phitsanulok Loei Phetchabun Operations Samchai (1972) Part of Communist insurgency in Thailand
 In 1973-1974 anti-communist operations Chiang Rai Phayao Nan Part of Communist insurgency in Thailand
 In 1974-1981 anti-communist operations Phitsanulok Province Loei Province Phetchabun Province Part of Communist insurgency in Thailand
 In 1981-1982 The mission to protect the eastern border of the First Army Area in Prachuap Khiri Khan Province
 In 1983-1984 Efforts to end the insurgency led to an amnesty being declared on 23 April 1980 when Prime Minister Prem Tinsulanonda signed Order 66/2523. The order significantly contributed to the decline of the insurgency, as it granted amnesty to defectors and promoted political participation and democratic processes. By 1983, the insurgency had come to an end. Part of Communist insurgency in Thailand
 In 1988 In Sangkhla Buri District Anti-poaching sovereignty The race in Payathonzu
 In 1989-1999 South Korea Separate units of the Royal Thai Army in United Nations Command
 In 1995–present Western Border Protection Kanchanaburi Province to Prachuap Khiri Khan Province
 In 1999 Humanitarian Operation in East Timor Part International Force East Timor in 1999 East Timorese crisis
 In 2003 Humanitarian Operation in Iraq. Thai Humanitarian Assistance Task Force 976 Thai-Iraq part of Multi-National Force – Iraq in Iraq War
 In 2004–present facing an Islamist insurgency in Southern Insurgency

Organization

9th Infantry Division Headquarters
 9th Infantry Division
 9th Infantry Regiment
 1st Infantry Battalion
 2nd Infantry Battalion
 3rd Infantry Battalion
 19th Infantry Regiment
 1st Infantry Battalion
 2nd Infantry Battalion
 3rd Infantry Battalion
 29th Infantry Regiment
 1st Infantry Battalion
 2nd Infantry Battalion
 3rd Infantry Battalion
 9th Field Artillery Regiment
 9th Field Artillery Battalion
 19th Field Artillery Battalion
 109th Field Artillery Battalion
 Service Support Regiment
 Transportation Battalion
 Maintenance Battalion
 Combart Medical Battalion
 19th Cavalry Squadron
 9th Combat Engineer Battalion
 9th Signal Corp Battalion
 9th Long Range Reconnaissance Patrols Company
 Military Police Company
 9th Aviation Company
 14th Ranger Forces Regiment
 17th Military Circle
 Fort Surasi Hospital

See also
 Thailand in the Vietnam War
 Thai Humanitarian Assistance Task Force 976 Thai-Iraq
 1st Division (Thailand)
 2nd Infantry Division (Thailand)
 4th Infantry Division (Thailand)
 5th Infantry Division (Thailand)
 7th Infantry Division (Thailand)
 15th Infantry Division (Thailand)
 King's Guard (Thailand)
 Royal Thai Army
 Thai Royal Guards parade

References

Infantry divisions of Thailand
Military units and formations of Thailand in the Vietnam War
Military units and formations established in 1968
Multinational force involved in the Iraq War